"First Sergeant's Call" is a bugle call which signals that the First Sergeant is about to form the company.

References
bands.army.mil

Bugle calls